The 1989 Colonial Athletic Association baseball tournament was held at Brooks Field on the campus of UNC Wilmington in Wilmington, North Carolina, from May 12 through 15.  The event determined the champion of the Colonial Athletic Association for the 1989 season.  The winner of the tournament, second-seeded , earned the CAA's automatic bid to the 1989 NCAA Division I baseball tournament.

For the first three years of the event, a different team won the Tournament.  Richmond, East Carolina, and George Mason each won once.  With their victory in 1989, East Carolina became the first program to win multiple championships.  During their tenure in the CAA which ended after the 2001 season, the Pirates would claim seven titles overall.

Format and seeding
The CAA's six teams were seeded one to six based on winning percentage from the conference's round robin regular season.  They played a double-elimination tournament with first round matchups of the top and bottom seeds, second and fifth seeds, and third and fourth seeds.

Bracket and results

Most Valuable Player
Brien Berckman was named Tournament Most Valuable Player.  Berckman was a pitcher for East Carolina.

References

Tournament
Colonial Athletic Association Baseball Tournament
Colonial Athletic Association baseball tournament
Colonial Athletic Association baseball tournament
College baseball tournaments in North Carolina
Baseball competitions in Wilmington, North Carolina